Otelia Cromwell (April 8, 1874 – April 25, 1972) was a distinguished scholar and Professor of English Language and Literature at Miner Teachers College. She was the first African American to graduate from Smith College, receiving a B.A. in Classics in 1900. She later earned her M.A. at Columbia University in 1910 and a Ph.D. in English at Yale University in 1926, becoming the first African-American woman to earn a doctorate degree there.

Early life, education and early career
Born on April 8, 1874, in Washington, D.C., Cromwell was the daughter of Lucy McGuinn and John Wesley Cromwell, and the eldest of six children. Her mother died when she was 12, leaving her responsible for her five younger siblings.  After graduating from the Miner Normal School (also known as the Normal School for Colored Girls), Cromwell taught in Washington, D.C. schools for several years before attending Howard University. In 1898 she transferred to Smith College, and graduated in 1900. At that time there were only two other black students at Smith College, Helen Maria Chesnutt and her sister Ethel, who both graduated a year later.

Career
Cromwell continued teaching D.C.’s segregated public schools for a few years before resuming her education. She taught English, German, and Latin at the M Street High School and the Armstrong Manual Training School. She earned a master's degree from Columbia University in New York City after attending summer sessions. She was awarded an academic scholarship and received her Ph.D in English from Yale University in 1926. Her dissertation, Thomas Heywood, Dramatist: A Study in Elizabethan Drama of Everyday Life, was published by Yale University Press in 1928.

Directly following her time at Yale, Cromwell became a professor of English Language and Literature at Miner Teachers College, later becoming Head of the literature department.  She taught there until her retirement in 1944. Throughout her academic career, Cromwell worked to advance the cause of civil rights and racial and gender equality. Upon her retirement, Otelia Cromwell began what was to be her major scholarly work, The Life of Lucretia Mott (Harvard University Press, 1958). Cromwell edited Readings from Negro Authors, an early anthology of African-American literary contributions.

Otelia Cromwell had a brother John. She was the aunt of Adelaide M. Cromwell, a sociologist and historian who was the first African-American instructor at Smith College.

She died at her family home in 1972 at the age of 98.

Honors
In 1950, Smith College awarded Cromwell an honorary doctorate.
Cromwell Academy, a private high school in Washington, D.C., was named in honor of Otelia and her brother John by its founder, Ruby Woodson in 1972. It was established to provide college preparatory education to high potential students of all social and economic backgrounds. The academy opened its doors in the educational annex of Peoples Congregational Church. The school closed its doors in 1985.
In 1989, Smith College began the tradition of celebrating Otelia Cromwell Day each November. Classes would be cancelled in order to discuss race and diversity.

See also
 List of African-American firsts

References

External links
 Smith College Archives
 The Life and Legacy of Otelia Cromwell

1874 births
1972 deaths
African-American academics
20th-century American women writers
Smith College alumni
20th-century African-American women writers
20th-century African-American writers